The Roman Legion, also known as the Vlach Legion in later bibliography, is the name used by the political and paramilitary organization active during the period 1941–1943, in Greece, in the regions of Thessaly and Macedonia, created by Alcibiades Diamandi, an Aromanian (Vlach) from Samarina (or ) who served as an agent of Italy and Romania. The Roman Legion had around 2,000 members.

History
Diamandi was active in the Greek regions of Thessaly and Macedonia during World War II, supporting the Italian and German occupation forces and promoting the creation of an autonomous Aromanian (Vlach) state, envisioned as the "Principality of the Pindus", a name also used for a similar attempt in 1917, in which Diamanti had also been involved. Calling himself a leader and a representative of the Aromanians of the Balkans, Diamanti established an organization named the Roman Legion and helped the Italian forces in the collection of weapons that the Greeks had hidden after the surrender of the Greek Army. Diamanti left Greece by the summer of 1942 for Romania and Nicolaos Matussis, an Aromanian lawyer, already active as second-in-command, replaced him in the organization. Another important figure in the Roman Legion was the Aromanian Vassilis Rapotikas, who led the paramilitary units. After action from several resistance groups in 1942 and the dynamic response of the ELAS against members of the Roman Legion, and the withdrawal of Italian forces, the Legion ceased to exist in September 1943, while Matussis fled to Athens.

The fate of the leading figures and the members of the Roman Legion is the following:

 Alcibiades Diamandi left for Romania in 1942, where he was later jailed when the Allies won and the new Communist government took power. He died in jail in Romania in 1948. In Greece he had been condemned to death from the Special Collaborationist Courts (Ειδικά Δικαστήρια Δοσιλόγων) set up in 1945–1947.
 Nicolaos Matussis also left Greece for Romania, one year later in 1943. He was also jailed and was handed over to the hands of the Greek authorities in 1964. In Greece, he started to serve his sentence, given to him in absentia, from the Special Treason Court after the war, but asked for re-trial and was found not guilty (at the time, several people were given pardon for their crimes, if they could demonstrate that they were not communists, and as he had been jailed in a communist country, he had a certain good-faith testimony). He was released and in his civil rights were completely restored by a Greek court. Up to his death, in 1981, he lived in Athens.
 Vassilis Rapotikas was captured by the ELAS and was killed on the way to the ELAS' headquarters in end of May or on the beginning of June 1943.
 The members of the Roman Legion who did not flee to Romania were tried in the Treason Courts set up in 1945–1947 and were sentenced. 617 people were accused, 152 were found guilty, 91 of which did not receive a sentence since they were already in prison sentenced for treason in other cases and for 55 there was no continuation due to their death (many of them killed by the Greek resistance). 319 were found innocent.

Leaders of the Roman Legion
 1941–summer 1942: Alcibiades Diamandi
 Summer 1942–1943: Nicolaos Matussis

References

Further reading
Τα παιδιά της λύκαινας. Οι "επίγονοι" της 5ης Ρωμαϊκής Λεγεώνας κατά τη διάρκεια της Κατοχής (1941–1944) (The children of the she-wolf, the "descendants" of the 5th Roman Legion during the period of the Occupation of Greece) (1941–1944), Σταύρος Παπαγιάννης (Stavros Papayiannis), Εκδόσεις Σοκόλη. , 1999, 2004

History of the Aromanians
Aromanian nationalism
Paramilitary organizations based in Greece
Pindus
Italian occupation of Greece during World War II
Secessionist organizations in Europe
Collaboration with Fascist Italy
Aromanians in Greece
Separatism in Greece
1941 establishments in Greece
1943 disestablishments in Greece